The JBCN International School is a private, co-educational day school, with its branches at Borivali, Oshiwara, Chembur, and Parel in Mumbai, India. The school is affiliated with the International Baccalaureate (IB), Cambridge Assessment International Education (CAIE) and Council for the Indian School Certificate Examinations (CISCE).

The Borivali branch of JBCN International School was recognized in Fortune India's Future 50 Schools Shaping Success and also listed amongst the Top schools in Mumbai city (North zone) in an annual survey published by Hindustan Times C fore Survey 2018.

History  
The JBCN International School was founded by Pinky Dalal, who established her first preschool, Children's Nook in 1984. It is being managed and run by JBCN Education Group, which promotes three international K-12 schools, 3 preschools and a teacher training initiative called Nation of Learning Excellence (NLE). Its first campus in Borivali became operational in 2009.

Academics and curriculum 
JBCN International School has been authorized to offer a combination of the following programmes from Cambridge Assessment International Education, International Baccalaureate and  Council for the Indian School Certificate Examinations (CISCE) across its 3 campuses.

Ranking

Awards and recognition 
 JBCN International School, Borivali has been ranked as one among the Future 50 Schools shaping the success in the country.
 In 2017, JBCN International School, Parel was ranked #7 in India, ranked #4 in Maharashtra and ranked #4 in Mumbai under the category "Top International Schools in India" by Education Today.
 In a survey by Times School Survey in 2017, JBCN School, Borivali has been ranked as the 6th best International school in Mumbai and  No.2 in Zone D for National+International Curriculum.
 JBCN International School, Borivali was awarded the Global Sustainable School Award, 2017 by GEAERD.
 In March 2017, the JBCN Education was awarded the 'Most Admired School for Quality Education in Maharashtra' at World Education Summit & Awards 2017, organized by Worldwide Achievers.
 The Parel branch of JBCN International School received the Mid-day Excellence in Education by Mid-Day in May 2017. 
 In November 2016, JBCN Education was recognised as one of India's Most Promising Brands in education by World Consulting & Research Corporation (WCRC).

Activities 
JBCN Education organized an 'Afternoon of Cricket' for its students at the Parel campus as part of the 2019 ICC Cricket World Cup initiative in association with the England and Wales Cricket Board in May 2018.

In November 2017, the Parel branch of JBCN International School held an anti-bullying week to raise awareness among students to identify, handle and report instances of bullying.

The Borivali school has been praised for its various environmental and eco-friendly initiatives. The Afternoon DC calls it "first 'eco-friendly' school" in the western suburbs of Mumbai.

See also

 List of schools in Mumbai
 List of schools in Maharashtra
 List of international schools in India

References

External links

High schools and secondary schools in Mumbai
International schools in Mumbai
Educational institutions established in 1984
Private schools in Mumbai
International Baccalaureate schools in India
1984 establishments in Maharashtra